Darrel Castillo (born 4 August 1992 in Livingston, Guatemala) is a Guatemalan judoka. He competed at the 2012 Summer Olympics in the +100 kg event but lost to Daiki Kamikawa in the first round.

References 

1992 births
Living people
Guatemalan male judoka
Olympic judoka of Guatemala
Judoka at the 2012 Summer Olympics
People from Izabal Department